A witch bottle is a counter-magical item used as protection against  witchcraft. They are described in historical sources in England and the United States. The earliest surviving mention of a witch bottle is from 17th century England.

Origins and purpose
One of the earliest descriptions of a witch bottle in Suffolk, England, appears in 1681 in Joseph Glanvill’s Saducismus Triumphatus, or Evidence concerning Witches and Apparitions:

Since at least the early modern period it has been a common custom to hide objects such as written charms, dried cats, horse skulls, concealed shoes, and witch bottles in the structure of a building. Folk magic contends that witch bottles protect against evil spirits and magical attack, and counteract spells cast by witches; they are countermagical devices, the purpose of which is to draw in and trap harmful intentions directed at their owners.

Description
Some of the earliest documented witch bottles consist of salt glazed stoneware jugs known as Bartmann jugs, Bellarmines, or "Greybeards". Bellarmines were named after a particularly fearsome Catholic Inquisitor, Robert Bellarmine, who persecuted Protestants and was instrumental in the burning of Giordano Bruno. Greybeards and Bellarmines were made of brown or gray stoneware glazed with salt and embossed with a bearded face.

Later witch bottles were made from glass bottles, small glass vials, and a variety of other containers.

Preparation

A white witch or folk healer would prepare the witch's bottle. Historically, the witch's bottle contained the victim's (the person who believed they had a spell put on them, for example) urine, hair or nail clippings, or red thread from sprite traps. Later witch bottles were filled with rosemary, needles and pins, and red wine. Historically and currently, the bottle is then buried at the farthest corner of the property, beneath the house hearth, or placed in an inconspicuous spot in the house. It is believed that after being buried, the bottle captures evil which is impaled on the pins and needles, drowned by the wine, and sent away by the rosemary.

Sometimes sea water or earth are used instead. Other types of witch bottles may contain sand, stones, knotted threads, feathers, shells, herbs, flowers, salt, vinegar, oil, coins, or ashes. A similar magical device is the "lemon and pins" charm.

Another variation is within the disposal of the bottle. Some witch's bottles were thrown into a fire and when they exploded, the spell was broken or the witch supposedly killed.

The witch bottle was believed to be active as long as the bottle remained hidden and unbroken. People did go through a lot of trouble in hiding their witch bottles – those buried underneath fireplaces have been found only after the rest of the building has been torn down or otherwise disappeared. The origins of this tradition have been dated at least to the 16th century. In ancient times the bottles were made of stone and originally contained rusty nails, urine, thorns, hair, menstrual blood, and pieces of glass, wood, and bone.

In England
This form of "bottled spell" dates back hundreds of years, and were prevalent in Elizabethan England – especially East Anglia, where superstitions and belief in witches were strong. The bottles were most often found buried under the fireplace, under the floor, and plastered inside walls. In 2016 a glass bottle found buried in the threshold of a man's house was featured in an episode of Antiques Roadshow filmed in Trelissick, Cornwall; glass specialist Andy McConnell tasted a small amount of the contents theorising it was possibly port or wine though he did note the rusty flavour and the presence of nails, a later episode in 2019 then revealed the contents had been analysed by Loughborough University that identified it actually contained "urine, a tiny bit of alcohol, and one human hair" alongside some brass pins dating from the late 1840s and an ostracod.  It was theorised to be a witch bottle.

In Belgium
During the renovation of the De Zwarte Ruiter pub in Turnhout, Belgium, in 2020 a jug from the 16th century was discovered. It was used to ward off witchcraft. It is the first time such a "witch bottle" has been found in Europe outside England.

In the United States
To date, less than a dozen possible witch bottles have been identified in the United States. Archaeologist Marshall Becker was the first to identify an American witch bottle in an archaeological context. Known as the Essington witch bottle, the artifact was recovered during excavations on Great Tinicum Island in Delaware County, Pennsylvania.  A mid-19th to early 20th-century slave or tenant site in Dorchester County, Maryland yielded a buried witch bottle whose cork stopper was bristling with straight pins. In 2016, a bottle filled with nails was excavated from the hearth of a Civil War site in Virginia and appears to be a witch bottle.

See also

 Amulet
 Apotropaic magic
 Concealed shoes
 Dreamcatcher
 Dried cat
 Frog coffin
 Hoko
 Horse skulls
 Poppet
 Shikigami
 Talisman
 Voodoo doll
 Witch ball

References
Notes

Bibliography

 Master’s thesis, Anthropology Program, Ball State University, Muncie, IN.

Further reading
Maple, Eric. The Dark World of Witches. New York: A.S. Barnes & Co., 1962
Pennick, Nigel. Secrets of East Anglian Magic. London: Robert Hale, 1995
Semmens, Jason. "The Usage of Witch-Bottles and Apotropaic Charms in Cornwall" Old Cornwall 12, No. 6 (2000) pp. 25–30

External links
 Brian Hoggard's site on witch-bottles and other apotropaic objects
 "17th Century Urine-Filled 'Witch Bottle' Found", MSNBC.com, 4 June 2009
 An American Witch Bottle
 Buried Bottles: The Archaeology of Witchcraft and Sympathetic Magic, M. Chris Manning
 Opening a Witch Bottle
 Witch Bottle, Jefferson Patterson Park & Museum, Maryland
 19th-Century Glass Witch Bottle from Lincolnshire, England, Portable Antiquities Scheme.
 mosoho's Bellarmine Jar
Lore Podcast Episode 156: Bottled Up 

European witchcraft
Folklore
Objects believed to protect from evil
Amulets
Talismans